The 2007–08 season was the 98th season in the history of AS Nancy Lorraine and the club's third consecutive season in the top flight of French football. In addition to the domestic league, Nancy participated in this season's editions of the Coupe de France and Coupe de la Ligue.

Competitions

Overall record

Ligue 1

League table

Results summary

Results by round

Matches

Coupe de France

Coupe de la Ligue

Statistics

References

AS Nancy Lorraine seasons
Nancy